Kilnadeema–Leitrim GAA is a Gaelic Athletic Association club located in the Kilnadeema and Leitrim areas of County Galway, Ireland which competes in the Galway Senior Hurling Championship.

History
The club is an amalgamation of the Kilnadeema and Leitrim clubs - they joined in 1975.

Achievements
Kilnadeema-Leitrim won their first U21A County Final on Sunday 8 February 2016, defeating their neighbours Loughrea by 0-12 to 0-6 at Duggan Park, Ballinasloe.

Kilnadeema–Leitrim reached the 2014 All-Ireland Intermediate Club Hurling Championship final, losing out to Rower–Inistioge after extra time.

 Galway Under-21 A Hurling Championship (1) 2015
 Connacht Intermediate Club Hurling Championship: (1) 2014
 All-Ireland Intermediate Club Hurling Championship: Runner-Up 2014

Notable players
 Rian Dwyer
 Brian Molloy
sean lyons
Emmett Lyons

References

External links
Kilnadeema–Leitrim GAA site

Gaelic games clubs in County Galway
Hurling clubs in County Galway